Zvornik is a city in Bosnia and Herzegovina. It is located in Republika Srpska, on the left bank of the Drina river. In 2013, it had a population of 58,856 inhabitants.

The town of Mali Zvornik ("Little Zvornik") lies directly across the river in Serbia. Kula Grad, a village that is part of Zvornik municipality, has a Middle Age fort, Zvornik fortress, built in the 12th century.

History

Zvornik is first mentioned in 1410, although it was known as Zvonik ("bell tower") at that time. The town's geographic location has made it an important trade link between Bosnia and the east. For instance, the main road connecting Sarajevo and Belgrade runs through the city. The medieval fort known as Kula grad was built in the early 7th century and still stands on the Mlađevac mountainous range overlooking the Drina Valley.

Ottoman rule

During the Ottoman period, Zvornik was the capital of the Sanjak of Zvornik (an administrative region) within the Eyalet of Bosnia. This was primarily the case because of the city's crucial role in the economy and the strategic importance of the city's location. The Sanjak of Zvornik was one of six Ottoman sanjaks with most developed shipbuilding (besides the sanjaks of Vidin, Nicopolis, Požega, Smederevo and Mohač). In 1806, Zvornik was home to Mehmed-beg Kulenović.

World War II
Ustasha troops of the fascist Independent State of Croatia occupied Zvornik, along with most of Bosnia, in April 1941. The town was liberated in July 1943 by the 1st Proletarian Brigade during the Battle of Zvornik.

Bosnian war

During the Bosnian War (1992–1995) Zvornik's Bosniak population was expelled. The military attack of paramilitary groups that came from Serbia on Zvornik Bosniaks commenced on 8 April 1992. During April 1992, many European news stations daily reported Serb armed attacks and mass killings of the Bosniak population of Zvornik and the surrounding villages.

On 19 May 1992, combined JNA, Serb paramilitary and Arkan's Tigers took control of Zvornik and Mali Zvornik. The suburbs of Karakaj and Čelopek were places of prisons where hundreds of local Bosniaks were killed. The remaining Bosniaks and non-Serbs were relegated to concentration camps and detention facilities throughout the area. During the war Serb forces destroyed mosques in and around the city.

Settlements
Aside from the city proper area of Zvornik, the municipality comprises the following settlements:

 Androvići
 Baljkovica
 Baljkovica Donja
 Boškovići
 Buložani
 Čelopek
 Cer
 Divič
 Donja Pilica
 Donji Lokanj
 Drinjača
 Dugi Dio
 Đevanje
 Đulići
 Glodi
 Glumina
 Goduš
 Gornja Pilica
 Gornji Lokanj
 Grbavci Donji
 Grbavci Gornji
 Gušteri
 Jardan
 Jasenica
 Jusići
 Kamenica Donja
 Kamenica Gornja
 Kiseljak
 Kitovnice
 Klisa
 Kostijerevo
 Kozluk
 Kraljevići
 Križevići
 Kučić Kula
 Kula Grad
 Liješanj
 Liplje
 Malešići
 Marčići
 Međeđa
 Mehmedići
 Nezuk
 Novo Selo
 Pađine
 Paljevići
 Petkovci
 Potočani
 Rastošnica
 Roćević
 Rožanj
 Sapna
 Skočić
 Snagovo
 Snagovo Donje
 Snagovo Gornje
 Sopotnik
 Šepak Donji
 Šepak Gornji
 Šetići
 Tabanci
 Trnovica
 Tršić
 Ugljari
 Vitinica
 Vrela
 Zaseok
 Zelinje

Demographics

Population

Ethnic composition

Economy

The table shows the number of registered people employed in legal entities by their core activity in 2018:

Culture

The Cultural Summer of Zvornik (Zvorničko kulturno ljeto) is an annual event held in the first week of August, usually for six days. Its main objective is to become a traditional cultural event which will open the doors of Zvornik for recognized cultural values.

The festival was first held in August 2001 as a local event and has grown to be one of to biggest festivals in the Balkans.

In 2007, famous singers such as Neda Ukraden and Sandi Cenov participated, but in 2008 theis festival featured some of the most notable stars from former Yugoslavia, like Željko Joksimović, Hari Mata Hari, Van Gogh and Marinko Rokvić. There is also a regatta on the river Drina, a fun marathon and many cultural events and competitions during day and night.

International co-operation
Zvornik is twinned with:
  Sremska Mitrovica, Serbia

Other friendships and cooperations, protocols, memorandums:
  Kolchugino, Russia

Sport
The local football clubs, FK Drina Zvornik and ŽFK Drina Zvornik, play in the First League of the Republika Srpska. Members of the First league of Republika Srpska also are volleyball and handball clubs Zvornik.

Notable people

 Seka Aleksić, singer
 Ermin Bičakčić, footballer
 Rade Đokić, footballer
 Amer Hrustanović, sports wrestler, European medallist
 Said Husejinović, footballer
 Goran Ikonić, basketball player
 Zlatko Junuzović, Austrian footballer
 Samir Muratović, footballer
 Nada Obrić, singer
 Denis Omerbegović, footballer
 Borisav Pisić, athlete
 Sejad Salihović, footballer

See also
 Podrinje
 Drina

References
 Official results from the book: Ethnic composition of Bosnia-Herzegovina population, by municipalities and settlements, 1991. census, Zavod za statistiku Bosne i Hercegovine - Bilten no.234, Sarajevo 1991.

External links

 Official website 
 Drinariver.com
 Zvornik Travel Guide - android aplikacija

 
Populated places in Zvornik
Municipalities of Republika Srpska
1410 establishments in Europe
Populated places established in the 1410s